Gloucester Theological College  (1868–1897) was an Anglican theological college for the Diocese of Gloucester and Bristol in Gloucestershire, England.

History
The college was established in 1868 (formally opened in 1869) by Charles Ellicott, Bishop of Gloucester and Bristol. It closed in 1897, the year that the Diocese of Gloucester was separated from the Diocese of Bristol.

The college was an affiliated college of Durham University. The college had an academic hood of a full shape black stuff with the cape edged with puce-coloured satin.

Notable staff
Edward Scobell, who was a lecturer at the college from 1877 to 1881.
Donald Spence Jones, Principal, 1875–77.

Notable alumni
Alfred Alston, hymnwriter.

References

Anglican seminaries and theological colleges
Former theological colleges in England
Religious organizations established in 1868
Educational institutions established in 1868
1897 disestablishments
1868 establishments in England